Marcos António Quintino Chuva (born 8 August 1989) is a Portuguese long jumper who competed for Portugal at the 2012 Summer Olympics in London. He was born in Oeiras.

Competition record

References

External links
 

1989 births
Living people
People from Oeiras, Portugal
Portuguese male long jumpers
Olympic athletes of Portugal
Athletes (track and field) at the 2012 Summer Olympics
World Athletics Championships athletes for Portugal
S.L. Benfica athletes
Universiade medalists in athletics (track and field)
Universiade bronze medalists for Portugal
Medalists at the 2013 Summer Universiade
Sportspeople from Lisbon District